Georgios Kaminiaris (born 20 October 1988) is a Belgian footballer who currently plays for 
RAEC Mons as a left-back.

External links

1988 births
Living people
Belgian footballers
Challenger Pro League players
Association football fullbacks
Royale Union Saint-Gilloise players
R.A.E.C. Mons players
UR La Louvière Centre players
K.V. Oostende players
Francs Borains players